Nemophora brachypetala is a moth of the Adelidae family. It is found in the Northern Territory and Queensland.

External links
Australian Faunal Directory
Image at CSIRO Entomology

Moths of Australia
Adelidae
Moths described in 1912